The First Portuguese Republic (officially: República Portuguesa, Portuguese Republic) spans a complex 16-year period in the history of Portugal, between the end of the period of constitutional monarchy marked by the 5 October 1910 revolution and the 28 May 1926 coup d'état. The latter movement instituted a military dictatorship known as Ditadura Nacional (national dictatorship) that would be followed by the corporatist Estado Novo (new state) regime of António de Oliveira Salazar.

The sixteen years of the First Republic saw nine presidents and 44 ministries, and were altogether more of a transition between the Kingdom of Portugal and the Estado Novo than they were a coherent period of governance.

Religion 
The First Republic was intensely anti-clerical. Historian Stanley Payne points out, "The majority of Republicans took the position that Catholicism was the number one enemy of individualist middle-class radicalism and must be completely broken as a source of influence in Portugal." Under the leadership of Afonso Costa, the Minister of Justice, the revolution immediately targeted the Catholic Church; the provisional government began devoting its entire attention to an anti-religious policy, in spite of the disastrous economic situation. On 8th October the religious orders in Portugal were expelled, and their property was confiscated. On 10 October – five days after the inauguration of the Republic – the new government decreed that all convents, monasteries and religious orders were to be suppressed. All residents of religious institutions were expelled and their goods confiscated. The Jesuits were forced to forfeit their Portuguese citizenship. A series of anti-Catholic laws and decrees followed each other in rapid succession. On 3 November, a law legalizing divorce was passed and then there were laws to recognize the legitimacy of children born outside wedlock, authorize cremation, secularize cemeteries, suppress religious teaching in the schools and prohibit the wearing of the cassock. In addition, the ringing of church bells to signal times of worship was subjected to certain restraints, and the public celebration of religious feasts was suppressed. The government also interfered in the running of seminaries, reserving the right to appoint professors and determine curricula. This whole series of laws authored by Afonso Costa culminated in the law of Separation of Church and State, which was passed on 20 April 1911.

The republicans were anticlerical and had a "hostile" approach to the issue of church and state separation, like that of the French Revolution, and the future Mexican Constitution of 1917 and Spanish Constitution of 1931. On 24 May 1911, Pope Pius X issued the encyclical Iamdudum which condemned the anticlericalism of the new republic for its deprivation of religious civil liberties and the "incredible series of excesses and crimes which has been enacted in Portugal for the oppression of the Church."

The Republic repelled a royalist attack on Chaves in 1912.

Heads of state and government

The First Portuguese Republic was an unstable period in the History of Portugal. In a period of 16 years (1910–1926) Portugal had 8 Presidents of the Republic, 1 Provisional Government, 38 Prime Ministers and 1 Constitutional Junta:

Evaluation of the republican experiment and legacy

Most historians have emphasized the failure and collapse of the republican dream by the 1920s. José Miguel Sardica in 2011 summarized the consensus of historians:

 
Sardica, however, also points up the lasting effects of the republican experiment:

References

Further reading
 Leal, Ernesto Castro. "Parties and political identity: the construction of the party system of the Portuguese Republic (1910–1926)." E-journal of Portuguese History 7#1 (2009): 37–44. Online
 Meneses, Filipe Ribeiro De. Afonso Costa (London: Haus Publishing, 2010); 227 pp. excerpt
 Sardica, José Miguel. "The Memory of the Portuguese First Republic throughout the Twentieth Century," E-Journal of Portuguese History (Summer 2011) 9#1: 1–27. online
 Wheeler, Douglas L. "The Portuguese revolution of 1910." Journal of Modern History (1972): 172–194. in JSTOR
 Wheeler, Douglas L. Republican Portugal: a political history, 1910–1926 (U of Wisconsin Press, 1999)

 
Republic 01
Portuguese Republic
History of Portugal by polity
.
.
Portuguese Republic 01
Anti-Catholicism in Portugal
Anti-clericalism
Portuguese Republic 01
Former countries of the interwar period
Portuguese 01
Portuguese Republic 01
Portuguese Republic 01
Portuguese Republic 01
States and territories established in 1910
States and territories disestablished in 1926